is a Japanese football player. He plays for Renofa Yamaguchi.

Career
Joji Ikegami joined J2 League club Renofa Yamaguchi in 2017.

Club statistics
Updated to end of 2018 season.

References

External links
Profile at Renofa Yamaguchi

1994 births
Living people
Osaka University of Health and Sport Sciences alumni
Association football people from Kumamoto Prefecture
Japanese footballers
J2 League players
Renofa Yamaguchi FC players
Association football midfielders